Charlie Chan in Honolulu is a 1939 American film directed by H. Bruce Humberstone, starring Sidney Toler as the fictional Chinese-American detective Charlie Chan. The film is the first appearance of both Toler as Chan and Victor Sen Yung as "number two son" Jimmy.

Plot
The film opens with Detective Chan rushing to the hospital to be with his daughter as she prepares to give birth to his first grandchild. While Charlie Chan waits at the hospital, his "number two" son Jimmy intercepts a message intended for Charlie about a murder on board the freighter Susan B. Jennings.

The freighter is on its way from Shanghai to Honolulu under the leadership of Captain Johnson (Robert Barrat). Jimmy wants to prove his investigative skills to his father and so boards the Jennings pretending to be Charlie Chan, with his younger brother Tommy (Layne Tom Jr.) in tow. The ruse doesn't last long and soon the real Chan arrives on board, interrogating a motley assortment of crooks, heiresses and crew as he works to solve a crime whose only witness is secretary Judy Haynes (Phyllis Brooks).

Cast
 Sidney Toler as Charlie Chan
 Sen Yung as Jimmy Chan
 Phyllis Brooks as Judy Hayes
 Eddie Collins as Al Hogan
 John 'Dusty' King as Randolph
 Claire Dodd as Mrs. Carol Wayne
 George Zucco as Dr. Cardigan
 Robert Barrat as Captain Johnson
 Marc Lawrence as Johnny McCoy
 Richard Lane as Joe Arnold
 Layne Tom Jr. as Tommy Chan
 Philip Ahn as Wing Foo
 Paul Harvey as Inspector Rawlins

Rest of the Chan Family

 Eugene Hoo Chan Son
 Frances Hoo Chan Daughter
 Hippie Hoo Chan Son
 Florence Ung Ling Chan
 Barbara Jean Wong Chan Daughter (uncredited)

References

External links
 
 TMC article on "Charlie Chan in Honolulu"
 
 
 

1938 films
Charlie Chan films
American black-and-white films
Films set in Hawaii
1930s crime films
20th Century Fox films
American crime films
Films scored by Samuel Kaylin
1930s English-language films
1930s American films